The 24 Hours of Le Mans is an endurance-focused sports car race held annually near the town of Le Mans, France. It is the world's oldest active endurance racing event. Unlike fixed-distance races whose winner is determined by minimum time, the 24 Hours of Le Mans is won by the car that covers the greatest distance in 24 hours. Racing teams must balance the demands of speed with the cars' ability to run for 24 hours without mechanical failure.

The race is organized by the Automobile Club de l'Ouest (ACO). It is held on the Circuit de la Sarthe, composed of closed public roads and dedicated sections of a racing track. The event represents one leg of the Triple Crown of Motorsport, with the other events being the Indianapolis 500 and the Monaco Grand Prix.

The 24 Hours of Le Mans was frequently part of the World Sportscar Championship from 1953 until that series' final season in 1992. In 2011, it was a part of the Intercontinental Le Mans Cup. Since 2012, the race has been a part of the FIA World Endurance Championship. In the World Endurance Championship's super-season of May 2018 to June 2019, the 24 Hours of Le Mans was both the second and the last round of the season.

Purpose

Launched when Grand Prix motor racing was the dominant form of motorsport throughout Europe, Le Mans was designed to present a different test. Instead of focusing on the ability of a car company to build the fastest machines, the 24 Hours of Le Mans would concentrate on the ability of manufacturers to build sporty yet reliable cars. This encouraged innovation in producing reliable and fuel-efficient vehicles, because endurance racing requires cars that last and spend as little time in the pits as possible.

At the same time, the layout of the track required cars with better aerodynamics and stability at high speeds. While this was shared with Grand Prix racing, few tracks in Europe had straights of a length comparable to the Mulsanne. Additionally, because the road is public and thus not as meticulously maintained as permanent racing circuits, racing puts more strain on the parts, increasing the importance of reliability.

The oil crisis in the early 1970s led organizers to adopt a fuel economy formula known as Group C that limited the amount of fuel each car was allowed. Although it was later abandoned, fuel economy remains important as new fuel sources reduce the time spent during pit stops. Such technological innovations have had a trickle-down effect and can be incorporated into consumer cars. This has also led to faster and more exotic supercars as manufacturers seek to develop faster road cars in order to develop them into even faster GT cars.

Additionally, hybrid systems (flywheel, super-capacitor, battery coupled with both petrol and diesel) have been championed in the LMP category as rules have been changed to their benefit and to further push efficiency.

Race

The race is held in June, leading to very hot conditions for drivers, particularly in closed vehicles with poor ventilation; rain is commonly seen. The race begins in mid-afternoon and finishes the following day at the same hour the race started the previous day.

Modern competitors often cover well over 5,000 km. The record is 2010's , six times the length of the Indianapolis 500, or about 18 times longer than a Formula One Grand Prix. Drivers and racing teams strive for speed and avoiding mechanical damage, as well as managing the cars' consumables, primarily fuel, tires, and braking materials. It also tests endurance, with drivers frequently racing for over two hours before a relief driver can take over during a pit stop while eating and resting. Current regulations mandate that three drivers share each competing vehicle.

Competing teams race in groups called "classes", or cars of similar specification, while competing simultaneously for outright placing amongst all classes. Originally, the race showcased cars as they were sold to the general public, then called "Sports Cars", in contrast with the specialised racing cars used in Grand Prix motor racing. Over time, the competing vehicles evolved away from their publicly available road car roots. Today, the race comprises two classes: prototypes and Grand Touring cars (similar to sports cars sold to the public).  These are further broken down into two sub-classes: constructors' prototypes, privateer prototypes, and two subclasses of GT cars.

Competing teams have had a wide variety of organizations, ranging from competition departments of road car manufacturers (eager to prove the supremacy of their products) to professional motor racing teams (representing their commercial backers, some of which are also car manufacturers who want to win without paying for their own teams) to amateur teams (racing as much to compete in the famous race as to claim victory for their commercial partners).

The race was the part of the World Sportscar Championship in every season from its inception in 1953 except the 1956, 1975-1979 and 1989-1990 seasons. However, Le Mans has always had a stronger reputation than the World Championship and is a round of the FIA World Endurance Championship. The race is also known as a leg of the informal Triple Crown of Motorsport which links Formula One, IndyCar, and sports car racing to represent a career achievement for drivers. Additionally, it is seen as a leg of the Triple Crown of endurance racing, which links the three largest sports car races together, with 12 Hours of Sebring and 24 Hours of Daytona forming the other legs.  Since 1998, the American Le Mans Series (now the IMSA Weathertech Sports Car Championship) has held an endurance race, along with the 12 hours of Sebring, every year called "Petit Le Mans", as a 10-hour American version. In 2014, the Weathertech Sports Car Championship (a merger of the races at Sebring; Petit Le Mans in Braselton, Georgia; the 6 Hours of Watkins Glen in Watkins Glen, New York; and the Rolex Sports Car Series' 24 Hours of Daytona) held all four major American endurance classics in preparation for teams to race at Le Mans.

Cars

The race has approximately 60 competitors. Each car was required to have at least two seats. However, recently cars only need to have space to accommodate a second seat in the cockpit rather than the seat itself. Two doors are allowed; open cockpit cars do not require doors. Since 2014, all cars in the premier LMP1 category must have a roof due to safety concerns, with open-cockpit cars only permitted in the slightly slower LMP2 category. Since 2017, all prototype cars, LMP1 or LMP2, must have closed cockpits.

Although all cars compete at the same time, there are separate classes. A prize is awarded to the winner of each class and the overall winner. The number of classes has varied over the years, but there are now four. Custom-built Le Mans Prototypes (LMP) are the top two classes, LMP1 and LMP2, divided by speed, weight, and power output.

For LMP2, teams are obliged to run one of four approved chassis – ORECA, Ligier, Dallara, or Multimatic/Riley – mated with a standard 4.2-litre Gibson V8 engine. LMP1 teams are subject to no such restrictions. Their extra power, lower weight, and more complex aerodynamics result in much quicker lap times; LMP1 cars also may use hybrid technology.

From 2011, the next two classes are production-based grand tourer (GT) classes, GT Endurance Pro and GT Endurance AM. Both of these classes use the LM GTE, or "Le Mans Grand Touring Endurance" regulations. Although the top class is the most likely to be the overall winner, lower classes have won on occasion due to better reliability.

Garage 56
Concept cars intended to test new automotive technologies may participate in the race under the "Garage 56" banner. Such entries are classified in the race results, though are not expected to be competitive as their sole focus is to demonstrate experimental features.

The program debuted in 2012 with the DeltaWing, an unusual rocket-shaped car fielded by All-American Racers and supported by Nissan. The DeltaWing concept showed promise, delivering nearly LMP2-level performance while only consuming 48% of the fuel, but retired after a collision with an LMP1 car six hours into the race.

In 2013, Garage 56 was given to the Swiss-designed hydrogen-fueled GreenGT H2, which was to be the first car without an internal combustion engine to compete at Le Mans. However, the car was pronounced unfit to take part in the race by the team a few days before the race. In 2016, the H2 went on to complete a single demonstration lap at Le Mans.

The Nissan ZEOD RC, a hybrid electric car based on the DeltaWing's design, took the Garage 56 slot in 2014. Despite an early retirement from the race after only 23 minutes due to a gearbox issue, the ZEOD RC achieved its goals of hitting a top speed of 186 mph, and completing the first ever lap of Le Mans using exclusively electric power at racing speed.

In 2015, the Garage 56 program took a break as all applications that year were deemed unfit by the ACO.

Frederic Sausset, a quadruple amputee, drove a modified Morgan LMP2 in the 2016 race. 

Financial problems forced Welter Racing to cancel its 2017 Garage 56 run with the Green4U Panoz Racing GT-EV, a biomethane-fuel prototype featuring a 3-cylinder 1.2-liter engine fueled by biomethane stored in cryogenic tanks. Welter Racing went on to develop the car with hopes of entering the car in 2018 and 2019, but ultimately did not compete due to complex issues with the car in 2018, and due to Don Panoz's death suspending the program in 2019. The 2019 slot was also eyed by UK-based constructor Perrinn with the Project 424, an LMP1-based electric-powered car with an autonomous driving mode; however, this did not come to pass, and Garage 56 was left empty in both 2018 and 2019 due to the ACO deeming none of the applications sufficiently mature.

2020 saw Frederic Sausset attempting to return to Garage 56 under the SRT41 banner by fielding a specially modified Oreca 07 LMP2 car with a lineup of three disabled drivers; however, the attempt was cancelled due to the COVID-19 pandemic. The SRT41 program was delayed to 2021, which saw Garage 56 successfully making a return for the first time in five years. Two of the drivers were paralyzed from the waist down.

In 2022, Garage 56 was once again empty. For 2023, a NASCAR Cup Series Next Gen stock car with a hybrid powertrain fielded by Hendrick Motorsports will be the Garage 56 entry.

Drivers

Initially, there were no rules on the number of car drivers or how long they could drive. Although almost all teams used two drivers in the early decades, some Le Mans drivers such as Pierre Levegh and Eddie Hall attempted to run the race solo, hoping to save time by not having to change drivers. This practice was later banned. Until the 1980s, there were teams in which only two drivers competed, but by the end of the decade, the rules were changed to stipulate that at least three drivers must drive each car.

By the 1990s, due to the speeds of the cars and the strain it puts on drivers, additional rules to reduce driver fatigue mandated that drivers could not drive for over 240 minutes over 6 hours and that no one driver could run for over 14 hours total. With careful management of driver stints, this makes it possible to complete the race with only two drivers (as Jeroen Bleekemolen and Cooper MacNeil did in 2014), although the vast majority of teams still continue to use three drivers.

In 2017, the driving time rules were further changed. If necessary, officials may require a drive time limit of 80 minutes of consecutive time behind the wheel and a minimum 30-minute rest break.  The rule applies only if the air temperature is at least 32 Celsius (89.6 F).

Traditions and unique rules

Although it has been a part of the World Sportscar Championship for most of its existence, the race has had different regulations for safety and competition reasons partly due to its length. For many decades, cars had to run at least an hour into the race before they could refill fluids for the car, such as oil or coolant, except for fuel. This was an attempt by the ACO to help increase efficiency and reliability. Those who could not last the first hour without replacing lost fluids risked disqualification.

Another rule unique to Le Mans is that cars must be switched off while refueling in the pits. Not only is this safer and less of a fire hazard, but it is also another test of reliability, as cars with the guaranteed ability to restart many times under race conditions are harder to make. Another element of this rule is that mechanics are not allowed to work on the car while it is being refuelled (other than helping a driver in or out of the car), which has led teams to adapt innovative ways to decrease the time of these lengthy pit stops. Drivers can get out of the car and be replaced by another driver during refuelling. Those rules are also applied in the FIA World Endurance Championship.

There are various long-standing traditions at Le Mans, including the waving of the French tricolor to start the race. This is usually followed by a fly-over featuring jets trailing blue, white, and red smoke. A similar flag tradition is track marshals waving safety flags during the race's final lap, congratulating the winners and other finishers.

Le Mans was the venue for the first televised instance of a winning driver celebrating by spraying champagne instead of drinking it. When Dan Gurney won the  race with co-driver A. J. Foyt, the two drivers mounted the victory podium, and Gurney was handed a magnum of champagne. Looking down, he saw Ford CEO Henry Ford II, team owner Carroll Shelby and their wives, as well as several journalists who had predicted disaster for the high-profile duo. Gurney shook the bottle and sprayed everyone nearby. Gurney autographed and gave the bottle of champagne to Life photographer Flip Schulke, who used it as a lamp for years before returning it to Gurney.

Schedule

The first race was held on 26–27 May 1923 and has since been run annually in June with exceptions in 1956, when the race was held in July; 1968, when it was held in September due to nationwide political turmoil in May; 2020, when it was moved to 19–20 September due to the COVID-19 outbreak & 2021, when it was moved to 21–22 August. The race has been cancelled ten times—in 1936 (a labour strike during the Great Depression) and between 1940 and 1948 (World War II).

The race usually takes place on the second weekend of June, with qualifying and practice taking place on the Wednesday and Thursday before the race, following a car inspection on Monday and Tuesday. Currently, these sessions are held in the evening, with two separate two-hour sessions held each night. Friday serves as a day of rest, and a parade of all the drivers through Le Mans is held.

Test days held at the end of April or beginning of May served as a pre-qualification weeding out the slowest cars. However, in 2005 the exorbitant cost of transporting cars to and from Le Mans led organizers to move the test day to the first weekend of June. Pre-qualification was eliminated in 2000, meaning that all competitors invited to the test would be allowed into the race.

Since 2001 the Le Mans Legend races have also been part of the schedule, usually running exhibition races during qualifying days, a few hours prior to the sessions for the Le Mans entrants.

Until 2008, the race started at 16:00 on Saturday (though in 1968, the race started at 14:00 due to the lateness of the race on the calendar). In 1984 and 2007, the start time was moved ahead to 15:00 due to the conflicting election). In 2006, the ACO scheduled a 17:00 start time on Saturday, 17 June, to maximise television coverage between the World Cup games. Fourteen years later, the race began at 14:30 because of the race being in September. The next year saw the race move to mid-August and began at 16:00. From 2009, when the race took place from 13 to 14 June, to 2019 & since 2022, it starts at 15:00 local time (CEST, 13:00 UT).

Classification
Initially, the car that covered the greatest distance from its starting position was the winner. With a dominant 1–2 lead, the two cars slowed to allow for a photo opportunity at the finish line, with Ken Miles slightly ahead of Bruce McLaren. However, since McLaren's car had started much farther back on the grid than Miles's, McLaren's car had covered the greatest distance over the 24 hours. With the margin of victory determined to be eight metres, McLaren and his co-driver, Chris Amon, were declared the winners. The decision cost Miles and Denny Hulme a victory. Miles had already won the other two endurance races at Sebring and Daytona. With a win at Le Mans, he would have become the first man to win all three and the first to win them all in the same year.

The "greatest distance" rule was modified with the introduction of a rolling start in 1971. Now, the car that completes the greatest distance as of the final lap's completion – where "greatest distance" is measured by the start/finish line for all competitors – wins. When two cars finish the same number of laps, their finishing order is determined by the faster overall completion time. This rule was used in the 2011 24 Hours of Le Mans to determine the race winner. The top two finishers completed 355 laps, with only 13 seconds difference between them.

Although "greatest distance run" determines the provisional order of finishers, additional requirements must be met for a car to be classified.
 A car must complete the last lap of the race and complete the entire circuit faster than a prescribed maximum lap time.  Ambiguity in this classification requirement has led to dramatic scenes where damaged cars have waited in the pits or on the edge of the track close to the finish line, restarted their engines, and crawled across the line to be listed amongst classified finishers. The practice of intentionally "waiting for the final lap" in this manner has been prohibited by rule in recent years.
 Cars must complete 70 percent of the distance covered by the overall winner to be classified. Even if it finishes the last lap of the race, a car failing to complete this number of laps is not deemed worthy of classification because of poor reliability or speed.
All classification requirements hold except in exceptional circumstances, as determined by the race stewards.

Le Mans start

The race traditionally began with what became known as the Le Mans start, in which cars were lined up along the length of the pits. Until 1962, cars lined up by engine capacity. Beginning in 1963, qualifying times determined the lineup. The starting drivers stood on the opposite side of the front stretch. When the French flag dropped to signify the start, the drivers ran across the track, entered and started their cars without assistance, and drove away. This became a safety issue in the late 1960s when some drivers ignored their safety harnesses, then a recent invention. This led to drivers running the first few laps either improperly harnessed due to attempting to do it while driving or sometimes not even harnessed at all, leading to several deaths when cars were involved in accidents due to the bunched field at the start.

This starting method inspired Porsche to locate the ignition key switch to the left of the steering wheel. In a left-hand drive car, this allowed the driver to use his left hand to start the engine and his right hand to put the transmission into gear, which in turn shaves off a few tenths of a second.

Stirling Moss developed another method for speeding up the start. His car was waiting with first gear already engaged. He switched the starter on when he jumped in without depressing the clutch. The starter motor immediately jerked the car forward, but the engine did not start due to low RPM. After a few seconds of motion, he pushed the clutch down, allowing the engine to speed up and start while the car was moving.

Feeling this type of start was unsafe, in the  race, Jacky Ickx opposed it by walking across the track while his competitors ran. Although he was nearly hit by a faster competitor's car while walking, Ickx took the time to fasten his safety belts before pulling away. Privateer John Woolfe died in an accident on the first lap of that race; Ickx won.

Cars were still lined up along the pit wall, but the drivers were already inside and strapped in. At the dropping of the French tricolor, the drivers started their engines and drove away.

Since 1971, when that method was done away with, a rolling start (sometimes known as an Indianapolis start) begins the race. Cars do one formation lap behind the safety car; when that car returns to pits, the starter waves the French flag to start the race.

Circuit

The circuit on which the 24 Hours of Le Mans is run is named the Circuit de la Sarthe, after the department that Le Mans is within. It consists of both permanent track and public roads temporarily closed for the race. Although it initially entered the town of Le Mans, the track was cut short to better protect spectators. This led to the creation of the Dunlop Curve and Tertre Rouge corners before rejoining the old circuit on the Mulsanne. To comply with this, two chicanes were added to the  straight. The addition of the chicanes was further influenced by the fact that the speed of WM P88-Peugeot French driver Roger Dorchy had been timed at  during the 1988 race.

The public sections of the track differ from the permanent circuit, especially in comparison with the Bugatti Circuit which is inside the Circuit de la Sarthe. Due to heavy traffic, the public roads are not as smooth or well kept. They also offer less grip because of the lack of soft-tyre rubber laid down from racing cars, though this only affects the first few laps of the race. The roads are closed only within a few hours of the practice sessions and the race before being opened again almost as soon as the race is finished. Workers have to assemble and dismantle safety barriers every year for the public sections.

History

1923–1939

The 24 Hours of Le Mans was first run on 26 and 27 May 1923, through public roads around Le Mans. Originally planned to be a three-year event awarded the Rudge-Whitworth Triennial Cup, with a winner being declared by the car which could go the farthest distance over three consecutive 24-hour races, this idea was abandoned in 1928. Overall winners were declared for every year depending on who covered the farthest distance by the time 24 hours were up. The early races were dominated by French, British, and Italian drivers, teams, and cars, with Bugatti, Bentley, and Alfa Romeo being the top brands. Innovations in car design began appearing at the track in the late 1930s, with Bugatti and Alfa Romeo running highly aerodynamic bodywork to run down the Mulsanne Straight at faster speeds. The race was cancelled in 1936 due to general strikes in France, and the outbreak of World War II in 1939 resulted in a ten-year hiatus.

1949–1969

Following the reconstruction of circuit facilities, the race was resumed in 1949 with renewed interest from major automobile manufacturers. 1949 was also Ferrari's first victory, the 166MM of Luigi Chinetti and Peter Mitchell-Thomson. After the formation of the World Sportscar Championship in 1953, of which Le Mans was a part, Ferrari, Aston Martin, Mercedes-Benz, Jaguar and many others began sending multiple cars backed by their respective factories to compete for overall wins against their competitors. This competitiveness sometimes resulted in tragedy, as in the 1955 Le Mans disaster during the  race in which Pierre Levegh's car crashed into a crowd of spectators, killing more than 80 people. The incident led to the widespread introduction of safety measures, not only at the circuit but elsewhere in the motorsport world. The entire pit complex was razed and rebuilt further back following the accident, allowing the pit straight to be widened. However, there was still no barrier between the track and the pit lane. Safety standards improved, but the cars got faster. Ford entered the picture with the GT40, finally ending Ferrari's dominance with four straight wins (1966–1969) before the 1960s ended and the cars and the race changed substantially.

1970–1980

For the new decade, the race took a turn towards more extreme speeds and automotive designs. These extreme speeds led to the replacement of the typical standing Le Mans start with a rolling Indianapolis start. Although production-based cars still raced, they were now in the lower classes while purpose-built sportscars became the norm. The Porsche 917, 935, and 936 were dominant throughout the decade, but a resurgence by French manufacturers Matra-Simca and Renault saw the first victories for the nation since the 1950 race. This decade is also remembered for strong performances from many privateer constructors, with two scoring the only victories for a privateer in the decade.

1981–1993

The rest of the 1980s was known for the dominance by Porsche under the new Group C race car formula that encouraged fuel efficiency. Originally running the effective 956, it was later replaced by the 962. Both chassis were affordable enough for privateers to purchase them en masse, leading to the two model types winning six years in a row. Jaguar and Mercedes-Benz returned to sports car racing, with Jaguar being the first to break Porsche's dominance with victories in 1988 and 1990 (with the XJR-9 and Jaguar XJR-12 respectively). Mercedes-Benz won in 1989, with what was seen as the latest incarnation of the elegant "Silver Arrows", the Sauber C9, while an influx of Japanese manufacturer interest saw prototypes from Nissan and Toyota. Mazda would be the first Japanese manufacturer to succeed, with their unique rotary-powered 787B winning in 1991.

In 1992 and 1993, Peugeot dominated the race with its Peugeot 905 as the Group C formula and World Sportscar Championship were fading in participation.

This began the ACO's trend to slow the cars on various portions of the track.

1994–1999

Following the demise of the World Sportscar Championship, Le Mans saw a resurgence of production-based grand tourer cars. Thanks to a loophole in the rules, Porsche succeeded in convincing the ACO that a Dauer 962 Le Mans supercar was a production car, allowing Porsche to race their Porsche 962 for one final time, dominating the field. Although the ACO attempted to close the loophole for 1995, newcomer McLaren would win the race in their supercar's first appearance thanks to the reliability of the BMW V12 powered F1 GTR, beating faster yet more trouble-prone prototypes. The trend would continue through the 1990s as more exotic supercars were built in order to skirt the ACO's rules regarding production-based race cars, leading to Porsche, Mercedes-Benz, Toyota, Nissan, Panoz, and Lotus entering the GT categories. This culminated in the  event, in which these GT cars were faced with the Le Mans Prototypes of BMW, Audi, Toyota and Ferrari. BMW would survive with the victory, their first and only overall Le Mans win to date. At the same time, Mercedes left sportscar racing indefinitely following three catastrophic though non-fatal crashes stemming from severe aerodynamic flaws with their CLR.

This strong manufacturer influence led the ACO to lend the Le Mans name to a sports car series in the United States in 1999, known as the American Le Mans Series, which ran until the end of the 2013 season after which it merged with Grand-Am to form the United SportsCar Championship.

2000–2005

Many major automobile manufacturers withdrew from sports car racing after 1999 due to the high cost. Only Cadillac and Audi remained, and Audi easily dominated with the R8. Cadillac pulled out three years later, and attempts by Panoz, Chrysler, and MG to beat Audi all fell short. After three victories in a row, Audi provided engine, team staff, and drivers to Bentley, a corporate partner, which had returned in 2001. In 2003, the factory Bentley Speed 8s beat privateer Audis. The Chevrolet Corvette Racing Team and their C5-R won several times in the GTS class, finishing 1st and 2nd in 2001, 2002, and 2004. They finished 2nd and 3rd in 2003 behind Ferrari.

2006–2013 

At the end of 2005, after five overall victories for the R8, and six to its V8 turbo engine, Audi took on a new challenge by introducing a diesel engined prototype known as the R10 TDI. Although not the first diesel to race, it was the first to win at Le Mans. This era saw other alternative fuel sources used, including bio-ethanol. At the same time, Peugeot decided to follow Audi's lead and pursue a diesel entry in 2007 with their 908 HDi FAP. In the 2008 race between the Audi R10 TDI and the Peugeot 908 HDi FAP, the Audi won by a margin of fewer than 10 minutes. For the 2009 24 Hours of Le Mans, Peugeot introduced a new energy-recovery system similar to the KERS used in Formula One. Aston Martin entered the LMP1 category, but still raced in GT1 with private teams. Audi returned with the new R15 TDI, but Peugeot prevailed in its first overall win since 1993.

The 2010 running reaffirmed the race as a test of endurance and reliability. Peugeot chose overall speed in adjusting their cars and engines to adhere to the 2010 regulations, while Audi chose reliability. All four Peugeots had retired at the end of the race, three due to engine failure, while Audi finished 1–2–3.

The 2011 and 2012 races were marred by a series of accidents. In 2011, the Audi driven by Allan McNish crashed heavily in the first hour, barrel rolling into a tire wall shortly after the Dunlop Bridge. At night, the defending race-winning Audi driven by Mike Rockenfeller crashed similarly between the Mulsanne and Indianapolis corners. Neither driver was injured, nor were any spectators. The third Audi entry was driven by Marcel Fässler, André Lotterer, and Benoît Tréluyer won the race. The 2012 race saw two factory Toyotas replace Peugeot, which had withdrawn earlier, but one flipped at Mulsanne Corner. Driver Anthony Davidson suffered two broken vertebrae but could exit the car himself. Shortly after sunset, the other Toyota retired with mechanical difficulties, giving Audi another victory.

In 2011, the race became the premier round of the Intercontinental Le Mans Cup, attempting to make a world championship for endurance racing again. In 2012, the race became the centerpiece of the FIA World Endurance Championship, the successor to the ILMC. The 2012 event was the first time the race was won by a hybrid electric vehicle, which was the Audi R18 e-tron quattro.

2014–2020 

Regulations were changed for 2014, notably with a requirement that all LMP1 cars must be closed-cockpit, some changes to the hybrid system, and the introduction of the slow zone system.

Porsche returned to Le Mans in 2014 with a new factory LMP1 program, and Nissan returned to run an LMP1 program in 2015. Audi withdrew from racing at the 24 Hours of Le Mans in 2016 and Nissan after only one attempt in 2015.

Porsche won the race in 2015, 2016, and 2017 with its hybrid 919, and remains the most successful manufacturer at Le Mans, with 19 overall victories.

In 2017, changes were made to the LMP2 regulations on cockpit and chassis, meaning all prototype cars must be closed-cockpit.

In 2018, Toyota won their first Le Mans with Fernando Alonso, Sébastien Buemi and Kazuki Nakajima driving. Toyota won the race again in 2019, 2020, 2021, and 2022.

2020 also saw the race held behind closed doors for the first time due to the COVID-19 pandemic.

2021–present 
2021 saw the introduction of the Hypercar class, a class which allows for Le Mans Hypercars and from 2023 onwards also LMDh cars to participate. 2021 saw the race once again being postponed, this time to August. For 2021 and 2022, non-hybrid LMP1 cars were allowed to participate as "grandfathered" LMP1 cars, although only Alpine would make use of this. Other entries in the hypercar class were Toyota and privateer team Glickenhaus. The new Hypercar regulations allowed manufacterers more freedom with the design, leading to cars such as the wingless Peugeot 9X8 which will enter in 2022. The LMP2 regulations were extended to 2024 with the next generation LMP2 cars, which are also used as chassis for the LMDh cars, is said to be introduced in 2025. 2025 will likely also see the introduction of hydrogen powered prototypes which will race for the overall victory.

Innovations
Le Mans has seen many innovations in automotive design to counteract the circuit's difficulties. These have either been dictated by rules or have been attempts by manufacturers to outwit the competition. Some innovations were incorporated into the everyday automobile.

Aerodynamics

One of the keys to Le Mans is top speed due to the long straights that dominate the circuit. This has meant cars have attempted to achieve the maximum speeds possible instead of relying on downforce for the turns. While early competitors' cars were street cars with their bodywork removed to reduce weight, innovators like Bugatti developed cars that saw the beginnings of aerodynamics. Nicknamed tanks due to their similarity to military tanks in World War I, these cars used simple curves to cover all the car's mechanical elements and increase top speed. Once Le Mans returned after World War II, most manufacturers would adopt closed bodies streamlined for better aerodynamics. A notable example of the changes brought about by aerodynamics are the 1950 entries by Briggs Cunningham. Cunningham entered two 1950 Cadillac Coupe de Villes, one nearly stock and the other completely rebodied in a streamlined aluminum shape developed by Grumman Aircraft Engineering Corporation that looked so unusual that it was nicknamed "Le Monstre" by the French press. The smoothing of body shapes and fairing-in of various parts of the machine brought about by the continual search for reduction of aerodynamic drag led to a separation from Grand Prix cars, which rarely had large bodywork.

As the years went on, bodywork became all-enveloping, while at the same time lighter. The larger bodywork with spoilers was able to provide more downforce for the turns without increasing the drag, allowing cars to maintain high speeds. Extended bodywork would usually concentrate on the car's rear, usually being termed long tail. The bodywork also began to cover the cockpit for less drag. However, open cockpits would come and go over the years as rules varied. Aerodynamics reached its peak in 1989 before the Mulsanne Straight was modified. During the  race, the crew of a Peugeot powered WM prototype taped over the engine openings, allowing Roger Dorchy to set a recorded speed of  down the Mulsanne in a publicity stunt. However, the car was almost undrivable elsewhere on the circuit. The engine was soon destroyed from a lack of cooling. However, for the  event, the Mercedes-Benz C9 reached  under qualifying conditions.

Engines

A wide variety of engines have competed at Le Mans in attempts to achieve greater speed and have better fuel economy and spend less time in the pits. Engine sizes have also varied greatly, with the smallest engines being a mere 569 cc (Simca Cinq) and the largest upwards of 8,000 cc (SRT Viper GTS-R).

Although the engines offered great power, they were hot and not fuel-efficient.

Another non-piston engine that would appear would be a Wankel engine, otherwise known as the rotary engine. Run entirely by Mazda since its introduction in 1970, the compact engine would also suffer from fuel economy problems like the turbine had, yet would see the success that the turbine lacked. After many years of development, Mazda finally succeeded in being the only winner of the race not to have a piston-powered engine, taking the  event with the 787B.

The Delettrez Special would be powered by a diesel engine. In contrast, a second diesel would appear in the form of the M.A.P. the following year. Although diesel would appear at other times over the race existence, it would not be until 2006 when a prominent manufacturer, Audi, would invest in diesel and finally succeed, with the R10 TDI.

Ethanol fuel appeared in 1980 in a modified Porsche 911, leading to a class win. In 2008, biofuels (10% ethanol for petrol engines and biodiesel for diesel engines) were allowed. Audi was the first to use next-generation 10% BTL biodiesel developed by Shell and manufactured from biomass.

Beginning in 2009, new regulations allowed hybrid vehicles with either KERS or TERS (Kinetic/Thermal Energy Recovery System) setups. However, only electrical (i.e., batteries) energy storage was allowed, ruling out flywheel-based energy recovery. Cars with KERS were allowed to race in 2009 under specific classification rules. Since 2010, they have competed for points and the championship. In 2012 the first KERS-equipped car won; the Audi R18 e-tron with a flywheel hybrid system by Williams Hybrid Power activated and drove the front wheels. This was only allowed in certain zones after the car had accelerated to at least 120 km/h to cancel out the acceleration advantage that four-wheelers could gain out of corners. In the same year, Toyota also started with a hybrid car, the TS030, which used KERS to power its rear wheels, meaning its usage was not restricted.

In 2025, the Automobile Club de l’Ouest is planning to introduce a hydrogen-electric prototype class. This class will be a one-design class with a chassis provided by Red Bull Advanced Technologies-Oreca and a powertrain supplied by GreenGT. The development of the hydrogen fuel cells powering the cars will be left to the teams themselves. According to the ACO's president Pierre Fillon, there is also a possibility of the cars being powered by a hydrogen combustion engine. The performance of the class is expected to be competitive with the top Hypercar class.

Brakes
With increased speeds around the track, brakes become a key issue for teams attempting to safely bring their cars down to a slow enough speed to make the Mulsanne Corner turn. Disc brakes were first seen in 1953 when the Jaguar C-Type raced at Le Mans. In 1955 the Mercedes-Benz 300 SLR introduced the air brake using a large opening hood on the rear of the car. Ford used a quick change brake rotor in 1966 to achieve their first victory at Le Mans.

In the 1980s, anti-lock braking systems became standard on most Group C cars as a safety measure, making it less likely that cars lose control at high speeds. By the late 1990s, reinforced carbon-carbon brakes were adopted for better stopping power.

Successful marques and drivers

Over the years, many manufacturers have managed to take the overall win, while even more have taken class wins. The most successful marque in the history of the race is Porsche, which has taken nineteen overall victories, including seven in a row from 1981 to 1987 and 107 class victories. Audi is next with thirteen wins, and Ferrari follows with nine, also including six in a row from 1960 to 1965. Since 2000 Audi has dominated the event, winning 13 times in 15 years of participation. Audi and Team Joest have had two hat-tricks, the first being in 2000, 2001, and 2002. Jaguar has seven wins. In contrast, Bentley, Alfa Romeo, and Ford all won four races in a row, with Bentley recording two additional victories in other years. In 2018, Toyota became only the second Japanese marque to win, following Mazda in 1991. Mazda is also the only company to win with a rotary engine. After Porsche's total of 107 class victories, Ferrari has 37, and Aston Martin, Audi, and Chevrolet each have 14.

Three drivers stand apart for their number of victories. His frequent racing partner, Derek Bell, trailing by a single win, with five. Three-time winner Woolf Barnato ( to ), Luis Fontés (1935), American racing legend A. J. Foyt (1967), Nico Hülkenberg (2015), and Fernando Alonso (2018-2019) are the only drivers to have won every Le Mans in which they participated.

Henri Pescarolo won the race four times, and holds the record for the most Le Mans appearances at 33. Japan's Yojiro Terada was active as a driver until 2008, and holds the record for the most Le Mans starts without an overall win. Claude Ballot-Léna holds the most class victories other than Kristensen with seven wins in GT class cars between 1970 and 1986. Graham Hill is the only driver to win the so-called Triple Crown of Motorsport, winning the Indianapolis 500 (1966), Monaco Grand Prix (1963, 1964, 1965, 1968, 1969), and the 24 Hours of Le Mans (1972).

Accidents

Le Mans has seen many fatal accidents due partly to the very high-speed nature of all variants of the track throughout history. The largest one was in 1955 when 83 spectators and driver Pierre Levegh were killed. In the wake of the disaster, many races were cancelled, including the Grand Prix races in Germany, Spain, and Switzerland (the latter as a part of a blanket ban on motorsport round-track races that was maintained until 2018). The accident led to safety regulations in all motorsports for both driver and spectator protection.

Almost all decades in which Le Mans has been run have seen their fair share of horrific accidents, such as in 1972 when Swede Jo Bonnier was catapulted into a forest surrounding the circuit after hitting a privately entered Ferrari near the Indianapolis section; Bonnier was killed instantly. The 1980s was a decade where some of the race's worst-ever accidents occurred. Although Armco barriers had been installed along the straight in 1969, there were still no chicanes on the Mulsanne Straight. In this place, almost all of the worst accidents occurred during that time. The prototypes, most of which were equipped with very powerful turbocharged engines in those days, were capable of doing more than  before reaching the kink and would still be doing the same kind of speeds at the end of the  straight – and even through the kink, which was a flat-out bend for all the cars on the track. In , Belgian Thierry Boutsen crashed horrifically on the Mulsanne Straight in his WM-Peugeot, killing a marshal. In the same race, Frenchman Jean-Louis Lafosse was also killed on the Mulsanne Straight when his Rondeau suffered a suspension failure, steered very suddenly to the right, and slammed into the Armco barrier on the driver's side at extreme speeds. The resulting explosion was so violent that the woods next to the track caught fire. Although Sheldon survived with severe burns, a track marshal was killed; two others were also severely injured. Sheldon's teammate, American Drake Olson in the second Nimrod-Aston Martin, who was following him down the straight, crashed heavily after running over Sheldon's bodywork; he went into severe shock but survived with minor injuries. The field was under the safety car for over an hour while the crash site was cleared, and the destroyed Armco barriers were replaced.

In 1985, a similar accident befell Briton Dudley Wood in a Porsche 962 during practice. Wood survived without injury. The car landed on its roof and was destroyed, but Nielsen escaped without injury. In , Jo Gartner drove a Porsche 962C into the Mulsanne barriers and was killed instantly after the car rolled multiple times, vaulted some Armco barriers, and knocked down a telegraph pole. Moreover, in 1987, American Price Cobb crashed a works Porsche 962C after slipping on oil during Wednesday practice. The fuel tank exploded and the car burned to the ground, but Cobb escaped without injury.

Gartner's fatal accident remained the most recent death in the race until Allan Simonsen's crash in 2013. However, there was one fatality during a practice session in 1997 (Sebastien Enjolras).

In 1999, the Mercedes-Benz CLRs suffered from aerodynamic instability leading to airborne cars. After initially happening at the Le Mans test day, Mercedes claimed to have solved the problem, only for it to occur again at warmup. Mark Webber was the unlucky driver whose car flipped on both occasions. The last and most damaging accident occurred during the race itself when Peter Dumbreck's CLR became airborne, flying over the safety fencing and landing in the woods several metres away. No drivers were severely hurt in any of the three accidents. However, Mercedes-Benz withdrew its remaining entry and ended its entire sportscar programme.

In 2011, two horrific accidents occurred to two of the three factory Audis in the LMP1 class. Near the end of the first hour, the No. 3 car driven by Allan McNish collided with one of the Ferrari GT cars, resulting in McNish's car smashing into the tyre wall and being thrown into the air at the Dunlop chicanes, resulting in pieces of bodywork flying over and nearly hitting many photographers on the other side of the barrier. In the eleventh hour of the race, another accident occurred to the No. 1 car driven by Mike Rockenfeller when he had contact with another Ferrari GT car. Only the main cockpit safety cell of the car remained, along with major damage being done to the barriers that needed to be repaired before the race was resumed. Audi had switched to a closed-cockpit car starting in 2011, a decision credited for the fact that neither driver was injured. The 2014 regulations required all cars to be closed-cockpit due to the 2011 accident. 
                                                                     
In 2012, Anthony Davidson, driving for the returning Toyota team in a Toyota TS030 Hybrid, collided with a Ferrari 458 GT2 of Piergiuseppe Perazzini, and became airborne before crashing into the tyre barrier of the Mulsanne Corner at high speed. The Ferrari also ended up in the barrier, flipping and coming to a halt on its roof. Davidson suffered broken vertebrae.

In 2013, Dane Allan Simonsen died after crashing into the barriers at Tertre Rouge. When the car collided with the guard rail, a mature tree had been touching the barrier, thereby preventing the guard rail from performing its safety function.

Coverage

Motors TV covered the Le Mans 24 Hours in its entirety in 2006 and 2007, including coverage of the scrutineering, qualifying, driver parade, warmup, and race. In the United States, FOX owned SPEED Channel, followed by Fox Sports 1 and Fox Sports 2 aired complete race coverage live either on-air or online through a combination of coverage from the French host broadcaster and its own pit reporting crew for several years. That deal ended after the 2017 season.  A United States television deal was not done for the 2018–19 WEC Super Season because of a renegotiation of its European contract.

In 2008, Eurosport secured a multi-year deal to show the entire race, including the qualifying and the motorcycle race. Every hour of the 2008 race was broadcast in segments on the main channel and Eurosport 2. However, a couple of hours were missed in recent years due to scheduling clashes with other sporting events. In addition, Eurosport provided live streaming on its website to subscribers. Since 2009, Eurosport and Eurosport 2 have covered all the action, and beginning in 2018, Eurosport gained United States broadcast rights for the World Endurance Championship for the race only on Motor Trend, a channel also owned by Eurosport's parent company.  Qualifying and practices aired on a direct-to-consumer streaming platform from Motor Trend magazine. In Australia in 2012, Ten Sport showed the race live and in full online.

The race is also broadcast (in English) on the radio by Radio Le Mans.

Appearances in media

Vintage racing

Since 2001, the ACO has allowed the "Le Mans Legend" event to participate on the full Circuit de la Sarthe. These exhibition races involve classic cars that had previously run at Le Mans or are similar to those. Each year, a particular era of cars may participate, with the featured era changing from year to year. Though most drivers in this event are amateurs, some noted professional drivers have appeared to race cars they had previously run, such as Stirling Moss and Derek Bell.

Starting in 2002, the "Le Mans Classic" has been held as a biennial event on the full  circuit in July. The races take place over a full 24-hour day/night cycle, with starts on set times allowing cars from the same era to compete simultaneously. A team typically consists of a car in each class. The team with the most points accumulated over five or six classes is declared the overall winner. The classes are based on the era in which the cars would have competed. The exact class requirements are re-evaluated for every event since the age for the youngest entries is shifted by two years for each event. In the first event, five classes ran more short races; later events have featured six classes running fewer but longer races. Drivers are required to have an FIA International Competition license. This event also includes a large Concours d'Elegance and auction.

See also
24 Hours of Le Mans (motorcycle race)
24 Hours of LeMons
Le Mans 24 Hours video games
List of 24 Hours of Le Mans winners
List of 24 hours of Le Mans records
Triple Crown of Motorsport
Radio Le Mans

References

Additional references
 "Le Mans 1965" in Automobile Historique, no. 48, May 2005 .
 "24 heures du Mans 1973" in Automobile Historique, no. 49, June/July 2005 .

External links

 Le Mans official website
 Racing Sports Cars – historical photos and results
 Le Mans History – The History of Le Mans 24 Hours race
 24h of Le Mans History and database

 
Sarthe
Recurring sporting events established in 1923
Group C
Le Mans
Tourist attractions in Sarthe
1923 establishments in France